The McMurdo Volcanic Group is a large group of Cenozoic volcanic rocks in the western Ross Sea and central Transantarctic Mountains areas of Antarctica. It is one of the largest provinces of alkaline volcanism in the world, having formed as a result of continental rifting along the West Antarctic Rift System. The McMurdo Volcanic Group is part of the Western Ross Supergroup, a stratigraphic unit that also includes the Meander Intrusive Group.

Subdivisions
Three subprovinces comprise the McMurdo Volcanic Group, namely the Hallett, Melbourne and Erebus volcanic provinces. The Balleny Volcanic Province along the Balleny Fracture Zone in the Southern Ocean was originally defined as part of the McMurdo Volcanic Group but is now excluded due to its location on oceanic crust with no obvious geographic or tectonic relationship to the other McMurdo volcanic provinces.

Hallett Volcanic Province

The Hallett Volcanic Province in northern Victoria Land is situated along the margin of the Transantarctic Mountains. Later studies showed that they erupted in a subaerial environment instead.

Volcanoes

Adare Peninsula
Hanson Peak
Hargreaves Peak
Coulman Island
Hawkes Heights
Daniell Peninsula
Mount Brewster
Mount Lubbock
Mount Prior
Tousled Peak
Hallett Peninsula
Quarterdeck Ridge
Redcastle Ridge
Mount Vernon Harcourt

Melbourne Volcanic Province

The Melbourne Volcanic Province is also in northern Victoria Land and forms an arcuate band extending from the Ross Sea coast into the Transantarctic Mountains. It consists of large volcanic centres and small but widely distributed basaltic vents.

Volcanoes

Mount Abbott
Baker Rocks
Malta Plateau
Markham Island
Mount Melbourne
Nathan Hills
Mount Noice
Mount Overlord
Parasite Cone
The Pleiades
Alcyone Cone
Mount Pleiones
Taygete Cone
Random Hills
Mount Rittmann
Shield Nunatak

Erebus Volcanic Province

The Erebus Volcanic Province is in southern Victoria Land. It includes marine volcanic centres in the southwest Ross Sea, major volcanic complexes in southern McMurdo Sound and several small basaltic centres in the McMurdo Dry Valleys, as well as along the foothills of the Royal Society Range.

Volcanoes

Beaufort Island
Black Island
Mount Aurora
Mount Melania
Brandau Crater
Brown Peninsula
Mount Discovery
Franklin Island
Mount Morning
Ross Island
Mount Bird
Black Knob
Boulder Cones
Castle Rock
Mount Erebus
First Crater
Half Moon Crater
Observation Hill
Second Crater
Mount Terror
Twin Crater
White Island

See also
List of volcanoes in Antarctica

References

Volcanoes of Victoria Land
Cenozoic volcanoes
Volcanic groups
Rift volcanoes
Geologic formations of Antarctica